The Merrimack Valley Library Consortium (MVLC) is an American library consortium created by Nancy Jacobson and Evelyn Kuo in 1982. MVLC manages the resource sharing of 36 automated and partially automated libraries in Merrimack Valley region of northeastern Massachusetts, ensuring unified access to all of their catalogs, which represent almost three million items and more than six hundred thousand titles.

Most library cards in Massachusetts are valid at MVLC member libraries.

MVLC Libraries:
Amesbury Public Library
Memorial Hall Library, Andover
Billerica Public Library
Boxford Town Library
Burlington Public Library
Gleason Public Library, Carlisle
Chelmsford Public Library
Moses Greeley Parker Memorial Library, Dracut
Dunstable Free Public Library, Dunstable
Essex Town Hall and TOHP Burnham Library
Georgetown Peabody Library
Groton Public Library
Langley-Adams Library, Groveland
Hamilton-Wenham Public Library
Haverhill Public Library
Ipswich Public Library
Lawrence Public Library
Reuben Hoar Library, Littleton
Pollard Memorial Library, Lowell
Manchester-by-the-Sea Public Library
Merrimac Public Library
Nevins Memorial Library, Methuen
Flint Public Library, Middleton
Newbury Town Library
Newburyport Public Library
Stevens Memorial Library, North Andover
Flint Memorial Library, North Reading
Rockport Public Library
Rowley Public Library
Salisbury Public Library
Tewksbury Public Library 
Topsfield Town Library
Tyngsborough Public Library 
G.A.R. Memorial Library, West Newbury
J. V. Fletcher Library, Westford
Wilmington Memorial Library

See also
Cape Libraries Automated Materials Sharing (CLAMS)
CW MARS (Central/Western Massachusetts Automated Resource Sharing)
Minuteman Library Network (MLN)
North of Boston Library Exchange (NOBLE)
Old Colony Library Network (OCLN)
SAILS Library Network

References

External links

Library consortia in Massachusetts
1982 establishments in Massachusetts